Dusty Diamond's All-Star Softball (released in Japan as Softball Tengoku) is a one- or two-player NES video game where players can select various fictional softball players and customize their own team to take to the championship.

Despite the game being a softball game, the rules are more reminiscent of baseball, with the exception of each game played to a maximum of 7 innings (unless extras are needed to break a tie).  Players can choose to play either "fast pitch" or "slow pitch" and assemble their teams from 60 characters, some of whom with noticeable trademarks. For instance:
 Diablo: looks like the devil bats with a club, but runs very slowly.
 Zelda: looks like a witch bats with a broom.
 Mike: skips as he runs.
 Binky: Has the ability to float while playing defense.

The game features 6 different "arenas" to play, each with their own features and ground rules:
 Sandlot: Based on a traditional sandlot, the field has areas with high grass and rocks with can interfere with a live play. To hit a home run, the player only has to hit a ball over the "home run line", not beyond the fence.
 Park: the area beyond the home run line has several park benches are trash cans with can interfere with the play.  
 Cliff: The smallest field. Any ball that rolls under the picket fence in the right field is a ground rule double.
 School: Based on a schoolyard. A home run is scored if a ball goes over the home run line, but if it breaks a window on the school's building, it's an automatic out.
 Island: similar to a professional field, there are 2 small lakes in a foul territory which are out of play.
 Professional (in 2-player mode only, or in 1 player after defeating the computer in the 5 other levels): standard field.  

Players may also choose their team name from a list of 25 names, each from a different letter of the alphabet.

The game also features a mercy rule, with the game ending if someone leads by 10 or more runs after an entire inning is played.

1 Player Game
The player selects a field and attempts to win one game on each field. Upon doing so, the player then faces a difficult all-female team of "un selectable" players called "The Amazons" on the professional field. Defeating the Amazons beats the game.

2 Player game

Players play an "exhibition game" on any one of the 6 available fields.

References

External links

1989 video games
Broderbund games
Baseball video games
Nintendo Entertainment System games
Nintendo Entertainment System-only games
Softball mass media
Tonkin House games
Tose (company) games
Multiplayer and single-player video games
Video games developed in Japan